Horetown is a civil parish in County Wexford, Ireland. The townlands of Raheenduff, Horetown North and Horetown South are among the 10 townlands within the civil parish. Protected structures in Horetown South townland include Horetown House (built ) and Saint James's Church Horetown.

References

External links
 Horetown entry in Lewis's Topographical Dictionary of Ireland, 1837 (via GENUKI)

Civil parishes of County Wexford
Church of Ireland parishes in the Republic of Ireland